Elizabeth Graeme Fergusson, or Betsy Graeme; (February 3, 1737 – February 23, 1801) was an American poet and writer.

Early years
Elizabeth Graeme, the sixth of nine children born to Dr. Thomas and Ann Diggs Graeme, spent much of her youth at Graeme Park, the family estate in Horsham, Pennsylvania, located outside of Philadelphia. Her mother, Ann Diggs, was the stepdaughter of colonial governor William Keith. Ann educated Elizabeth, teaching her to read and write, an advantage that most young girls in colonial America did not receive. Aside from writing poetry, Elizabeth's main literary project was the translation of Les Aventures de Télémaque from the original French.

Career
When Elizabeth was seventeen, she met, and later began courting, William Franklin, son of Benjamin Franklin. The two were engaged in 1757. William moved to England to study law, and the couple's relationship became strained. A miscommunication had occurred and William believed the engagement had been broken, and he married another woman while in Britain, while Elizabeth thought the two were still engaged.

After the death of her sister, Elizabeth became the guardian and educator of her niece, Anna Young Smith, and nephew. Elizabeth encouraged the poetic talents of Anna, introducing her to the literary circles of Philadelphia. Anna's poem An Ode to Gratitude was dedicated to Elizabeth as a sign of her gratefulness.

In 1764, Elizabeth traveled to London at the urging of her mother, whose health was failing. Another reason to travel to London, was to lift her spirits from the recent breakup. While in London, Elizabeth met Laurence Sterne and King George III. While she was in England, she kept a travel journal, which was later circulated and read among her peers in Philadelphia. Upon returning to Graeme Park, Elizabeth learned that her mother had died while she was travelling. Elizabeth thus overtook the role of female head-of-household after her mother's death, hosting "attic evenings"—salon gatherings for her elite male and female acquaintances. It was at one of these "attic evenings" that Elizabeth met Hugh Henry Fergusson. The two had a quick courtship, became engaged, and married secretly in 1772 and without the approval of her father. One month later, Elizabeth's father died of a stroke, never having learned of his daughter's marriage. As a result, he left the property at Graeme Park in her name, though under colonial law, Elizabeth was a feme covert, meaning that all of her property belonged to her husband when they were married.

Henry spent much of the couple's marriage in England and in Philadelphia, working for the British. When the British evacuated the city of Philadelphia in 1778, Henry left for London. He sent a number of letters to Elizabeth pleading for her to join him in England, but she remained in Pennsylvania for the rest of her life. After the war, the Pennsylvania government confiscated Graeme Park, asserting that it was property that belonged to the alleged Loyalist Henry Fergusson. Elizabeth was forced to vacate the property and for two years lived with various acquaintances and family members. After two years of petitioning the government, Elizabeth finally regained the right to her property and moved back to Graeme Park in 1781. In 1791, however, Elizabeth could no longer afford the upkeep of the property and was forced to sell. For the final ten years of her life, Elizabeth lived with friends and wrote voraciously, publishing some of her poetry and participated in the writing of commonplace books with a number of her female acquaintances, such as Hannah Griffitts. She died in 1801, while being tended to by Benjamin Rush, very close to Graeme Park.

Elizabeth is buried on the south side of the churchyard of Christ Church in Philadelphia.

Writer 
Elizabeth Ferguson wrote letters to get help regaining her property after it was confiscated. These letters tended to be forceful and vigorous in order for her to get the help she needed. On the other hand, her poems showed more of her emotional side. One of her longest and most poems was "Il Penseroso or The Deserted Wife". The poem had four parts: hope, solitude, doubt, and adversity. The poem traces the progress of her grieve as she feels abandoned by her husband. In part one, Fergusson is angry at her husband, Henry, because he deserted her but, more importantly, because there were rumors he had gotten a servant pregnant. Eventually, Ferguson realizes that she is not alone in her anger and grief. She realizes that she has many things in common with other loyalist women such as Grace Growden Galloway.  In the second part of her poem, she writes "My Shattered Fortunes I with calmness Bore/ A Loss in Common but with thousand more". Her connection with other women is one reason she is regarded highly by historians.

References

Further reading

External links
"Elizabeth Graeme Fergusson" at Friends of Graeme Park
Biographical Note at Dickinson College Library

1737 births
1801 deaths
Poets from Pennsylvania
18th-century American poets
18th-century American women writers
American women poets
Burials at Christ Church, Philadelphia
People of colonial Pennsylvania
People from Horsham Township, Pennsylvania
Colonial American poets
Colonial American women